Luca Gammaitoni (born 16 June 1961 in Perugia) is a scientist in the area of noise and nonlinear dynamics. He is currently the Director of the Noise in Physical System Laboratory (NiPS Lab) at the Physics Department of the Università di Perugia, in Italy.

Education and career

He graduated in Physics at the University of Perugia and obtained his Ph.D. in physics from the University of Pisa in 1991 (S. Santucci advisor). His thesis was entitled "Stochastic Resonance". He is currently Professor at the Faculty of Science of the University of Perugia in Italy. The Noise in Physical Systems (NiPS) Laboratory is a research facility within the Physics Department of the University of Perugia. NiPS has a long-standing tradition in studying physical systems in the presence of noise. Scientific interest ranges from stochastic nonlinear dynamics modelling to thermal noise measurements.

Scientific Interests
 Stochastic nonlinear dynamics with specific reference to Stochastic Resonance, dithering, resonant trapping, resonant crossing phenomena.
 Energy Harvesting, with specific reference to nonlinear vibration harvesting, micro and nanoscale energy management.
 Energy efficiency in computing devices, with specific reference to micro and nanoscale logic gate devices
 Thermal noise and non equilibrium relaxation processes in solid state systems
 Thermodynamics of computing and fundamental limits in the physics of computation.

Publications
 The Physics of Computing, Springer, 2021

External links
 http://www.fisica.unipg.it/gammaitoni – Luca Gammaitoni web page at the Physics Department of the Università di Perugia
 http://www.nipslab.org – Noise in Physical Systems Laboratory

1961 births
Living people
Probability theorists
21st-century Italian physicists
University of Perugia alumni
University of Pisa alumni
Academic staff of the University of Perugia